Prospanica The Association of Hispanic Professionals is a non-profit organization dedicated to empowering the Hispanic community to achieve their full educational, economic, and social potential. The organization was first formed in 1988 as the National Society of Hispanic MBAs (NSHMBA), but outgrew its original mission and adopted its new name, Prospanica, in 2016. 
Prospanica’s founders and early supporters acted on their shared vision of creating an organization that would nurture Hispanic students in their efforts to obtain an MBA degree. These pioneers identified the need to develop a pipeline of Hispanic leaders to pursuing an MBA and this became their mission in 1988. 
Though Hispanics with MBAs had been the sole focus, 2015 marked the year in which Prospanica extended its reach beyond the MBA community to undergraduate students. Prospanica realized that by building Hispanic talent from the ground up they empower business professionals to achieve their full educational, economic, and social potential.
Current trends depict that Hispanics are the largest growing minority group, have the highest drop-out rate and are severely underrepresented in professional employment. 
With Hispanics estimating to account for 60 percent growth of the U.S. population between 2005 and 2050, Prospanica helps empower Hispanics succeed in education and the workforce—an immediate and long-term priority to the nation’s economy

Organization
Prospanica's headquarters are in Dallas, Texas and as of 2017 it has 41 professional chapters and 5 university chapters in the United States and Puerto Rico. The full list of chapters can be found in the external links section.

Prospanica is run nationally by a 7-member board led by a chair. The board member positions are:

National Chair
National Secretary
National Treasurer
National Director/CEO
3 additional National Directors

History
Prospanica, formerly National Society of Hispanic MBAs was founded on March 8, 1988 by a group of Hispanic MBAs led by Henry Hernandez.  Their goals was to remedy the lack of representation in the corporate world for Hispanic business leaders, and to reverse the decline of Hispanics enrolled in graduate management education programs throughout the country  The  founding members spent the next nine months developing the concept for the organization, identifying key partners, and establishing a framework for the organization.  The group was then officially launched in January, 1989.

References

External links
 Official site
The full list of Professional Chapters:
 Atlanta
 Austin
 Boston
 Chicago
 Cincinnati
 Cleveland
 Connecticut
 Dallas-Ft. Worth
 Denver
 Detroit 
 El Paso
 Houston   
 Indianapolis
 Kansas City 
 Los Angeles
 Louisville
 Minneapolis-St. Paul
 New Jersey  
 New York 
 New Mexico 
 Orange County
 Oregon
 Orlando
 Philadelphia 
 Phoenix
 Puerto Rico
 Rio Grande Valley
 Rochester
 San Antonio
 San Diego
 San Francisco
 San Jose
 Seattle
 [* Tampa Bay
 Washington DC

Nonpartisan organizations in the United States
Organizations established in 1988
Hispanic and Latino American professional organizations